Broad Street on Lagos Island, Lagos, Nigeria, is a commercial hub in one of the city's central business districts. Among the tenants: Bagatelle restaurant, Christ Church Cathedral Primary School, Methodist   Boys High School, Newswatch (Nigeria), and St. Mary's Private School. The "Secretariat" building was constructed in 1906.

References

External links
 Postcard, circa 1920s
 Photo of Broad St., 1949
 Image of Secretariat building

Streets in Lagos
Lagos Island